Yuki Sakai may refer to:
 Yuki Sakai (footballer, born 1985) (酒井 悠基), Japanese male footballer
 Yuki Sakai (footballer, born 1989) (坂井 優紀), Japanese female footballer